Galium emeryense (Emery County bedstraw) is a plant species in the Rubiaceae. It is native to the state of Utah in the United States.

References

External links

emeryense
Flora of Utah
Plants described in 1977
Flora without expected TNC conservation status